Marcelo Faggi (born 13 October 1964 in Entre Ríos Province) played as scrumhalf.

Career
He mainly played his career for Estudiantes de Paraná, where he played until 1994, when he moved to Italy to play for Rugby Lyons Piacenza. He also was called for the 1987 Rugby World Cup to play for Argentina as a replacement for Martín Yangüela, who was injured before the match against New Zealand, but never saw action.
Currently, Faggi coaches Entre Ríos provincial sevens team.

Notes

External links

1964 births
Living people
Argentine rugby union players
Rugby union scrum-halves
Sportspeople from Entre Ríos Province